Franklinville is an unincorporated community in Baltimore County, Maryland, United States. southeast of Kingsville.

References

External links

 Franklinville United Presbyterian Church founded 1852
 Site of the former Franklinville Cotton Factory
 Site of the former Belko Corporation

Unincorporated communities in Baltimore County, Maryland
Unincorporated communities in Maryland